Centro de los Héroes is a Santo Domingo Metro station and the southern terminus of Line 1. It was open on 22 January 2009 as part of the inaugural section of Line 1 between Mamá Tingó and Centro de los Héroes. The adjacent station is Francisco Alberto Caamañol.

This is an underground station, built below Avenida Enrique Jimenez Moya.

References

Santo Domingo Metro stations
2009 establishments in the Dominican Republic
Railway stations opened in 2009